Gianfranco Bellini (10 July 1924 – 9 August 2006) was an Italian film, television and voice actor.

Biography
Born in Palermo to parents who were also actors, Bellini made his film debut at age 12 alongside his mother in the 1936 film The Two Sergeants. The following year, Bellini starred in Mario Camerini's Il signor Max. He was credited under his mother's maiden name. In 1948, Bellini sought a career in voice dubbing. His first ever Italian dubbing role was in Bambi in which he voiced the title character as an adolescent.

Bellini's career as a voice actor skyrocketed during the 1950s and 1960s. His most famous Italian dubbing roles included John Bosley (portrayed by David Doyle) in Charlie's Angels and HAL 9000 in the 1968 film 2001: A Space Odyssey. Bellini was the official Italian voice of Donald O'Connor and he also dubbed James Tolkan and Elisha Cook Jr. in some of their films. In his animated roles, Bellini performed the Italian voices of Roger Radcliffe in One Hundred and One Dalmatians, Nutsy in Robin Hood and a Fox in Mary Poppins.

Personal life
Bellini's daughter Silvia previously worked as a voice actress. He was also the maternal grandfather of voice actors Davide and Elena Perino.

Death
Bellini died after a long illness in Rome on 9 August 2006 at the age of 82.

Filmography

Cinema
The Two Sergeants (1936)
Il signor Max (1937) - Credited as "Gianfranco Zanchi"
The Flowers of St. Francis (1950)
Allonsanfàn (1974)

Dubbing roles

Animation
Adult Bambi in Bambi
Roger Radcliffe in One Hundred and One Dalmatians
Nutsy in Robin Hood
Br'er Fox in Song of the South
Fox in Mary Poppins
Bookseller in Beauty and the Beast

Live action
John Bosley in Charlie's Angels
HAL 9000 in 2001: A Space Odyssey
Peter Stirling in Francis the Talking Mule
Dr. Noah / Jimmy Bond in Casino Royale
Mr. Strickland in Back to the Future
Sheriff Strickland in Back to the Future Part III
Marvin Acme in Who Framed Roger Rabbit
Charlie Bassett in Gunfight at the O.K. Corral
Jefferson Yorke in Rio Grande
Abu in The Thief of Bagdad
Jonathan Forbes in Pillow Talk
Hans Beckert in M

References

External links
 

1924 births
2006 deaths
20th-century Italian male actors
Italian male voice actors
Italian male television actors
Italian male film actors
Italian male stage actors
Italian male child actors
Italian male radio actors
Male actors from Palermo